Petrophila axis is a moth in the family Crambidae. It was described by George Hampson in 1895. It is found in Grenada in the southeastern Caribbean Sea.

References

Petrophila
Moths described in 1895